Krajčík (Krajcik) is a Slovak-language occupational surname, meaning 'tailor'. Notable people with the surname include:

Matej Krajčík, Slovak footballer
Josh Krajcik, American singer-songwriter

Occupational surnames
Slovak-language surnames